In enzymology, a xanthommatin reductase is an enzyme that catalyzes the chemical reaction

5,12-dihydroxanthommatin + NAD+  xanthommatin + NADH + H+

Thus, the two substrates of this enzyme are 5,12-dihydroxanthommatin and NAD+, whereas its three products are xanthommatin, NADH, and H+.

This enzyme belongs to the family of oxidoreductases, specifically those acting on the CH-CH group of donor with NAD+ or NADP+ as acceptor.  The systematic name of this enzyme class is 5,12-dihydroxanthommatin:NAD+ oxidoreductase.

References

 

EC 1.3.1
NADH-dependent enzymes
Enzymes of unknown structure